"Personal Jesus" is the tenth episode of the fourteenth season of the American medical drama  television series Grey's Anatomy and the 303rd episode  overall. It aired on ABC on January 25, 2018. The episode was written by former E.R. physician and writer Zoanne Clack and directed by Kevin Rodney Sullivan. "Are You With Me" by Nilu was featured in this episode.

Plot
With Paul recovering from his injuries from a hit and run, Meredith questions the alibi that Alex and Jo provide her. Believing that it’s his fiancé, Jenny, who ran him over, Jo consults her. She offers Jenny support and prompts her to formally press domestic abuse charges against Paul. Meredith is later informed by the police that the perpetrator was a drunk driver and has been arrested. While Jo and Jenny go to Paul’s room to announce they are taking him to court, in a bout of rage he ends up falling out of his bed and knocking himself out, becoming brain dead. Still legally his wife, Jo decides to take him off life support and have his organs donated.

April’s patient turns out to be the pregnant wife of her ex-fiance, Matthew, proving to be more than an awkward situation as she helps deliver their baby. She offers Matthew an apology for her past actions but realizes that he has moved on from her and is happy with his life. Matthew's wife suffers from an internal bleed and is rushed into surgery. April later watches him deal with her unexpected death and is informed about the death of her other patients. She ends up in the shower with Roy, an intern, after she finds herself questioning her faith.

Jackson and Bailey treat a 12-year-old patient who had been shot by police on the grounds of racial profiling. Meanwhile, Maggie organizes a science camp for Bailey's son, Tucker and his friends. The eventual death of the patient prompts Bailey and Ben to have "the talk" about racial profiling and police brutality with Tucker.

Production
The episode was written by Zoanne Clack and directed by Kevin Rodney Sullivan.

Reception

Ratings
The episode aired on American Broadcasting Company on January 25, 2018. Upon initial release, it was viewed by 8.62 million people, an increase of 0.35 million from the previous installment and the mid-season premiere "1-800-799-7233"; it also garnered a season-best 2.3/9 Nielsen rating. "Personal Jesus" was also the week's second most watched drama and ranked seventh on the list of most watched television programmes overall. The 8.62 million audience was also the largest for Grey's Anatomy in over a year.

Reviews
"Personal Jesus" opened to positive reviews from television critics; commentators highlighted Drew and Luddignton for their respective performances and the treatment of such socially relevant stories as domestic abuse and police brutality in the United States. Lacey Vorrasi-Banis of Entertainment Weekly positively reviewed April's character development, and noted that she "is in the darkest place we’ve ever seen her". She was also appreciative of the episode titlewhich she thought was appropriate and the biblical inspiration of the April's story. TVFanatics Jasmine Blu thought of "Personal Jesus" as one of the series' best episodes in a long time; she lauded Drew for her performance writing that the storyline gave her "the room to show off her range and excel". The view was echoed by Maggie Fremont of Vulture, who was hopeful that the episode, Drew's performance in particular, would change the perception towards her character for the good. She also praised the return of Bruening's character and the closure offered to him. Also appreciating the April's development over the course of the episode, she noted that the character's "dark" side is new territory for Grey’s Anatomy.

References

Grey's Anatomy (season 14) episodes
2018 American television episodes